The Order of Freedom of the Republic of Slovenia is the highest state decoration of Slovenia. 

It is awarded by President of Slovenia. It was established in 1992. The Order act was amended in 2004 and limited its purpose to the following clause: "for services rendered in the defence of freedom and the assertion of the sovereignty of the Republic of Slovenia".

There are three degrees in the Order of Freedom:
The Gold Order of Freedom is symbolised with a medal on a necklace. The medal is a gold version of the Order of Freedom medallion, on a blue ribbon necklace with tricolor stripes. The bar pin is also gold.
The Silver Order of Freedom is symbolised the same way as the Order of Freedom, but the medallion and bar pins are silver.
The Order of Freedom is symbolised by a small crystal medallion with a center medal in the tricolors of the Slovenian flag. Recipients also receive an aluminum bar pin with the Slovenian tricolors in the center.

References

Orders, decorations, and medals of Slovenia